Pamela Phatsimo Sunstrum is a visual artist. Her practice includes drawing, painting, installation, and animation. Her work has been featured in numerous exhibitions, including the GTA21 Triennial Exhibition at the Museum of Contemporary Art in Toronto, Canada; The Bronx Museum in New York, USA; The Wiels Contemporary Art Centre in Brussels, Belgium; Museum der Moderne Salzburg, Kunsthaus Zürich, Germany; The Showroom in London, England; and the Zeitz Museum of Contemporary Art Africa in Johannesburg, South Africa.

Biography 
Sunstrum was born in 1980 in Mochudi, Botswana, and spent her childhood in different parts of Africa and southeast Asia. She came to the United States in 1998 and received a BA with Highest Honors from the University of North Carolina at Chapel Hill in International Studies with a concentration in Trans-national Cultures in 2004. Sunstrum received her MFA from the Mt. Royal School of Art at the Maryland Institute College of Art in 2007. She later lived in Baltimore Maryland as an artist in residence at the Baltimore Creative Alliance, while also teaching at the Maryland Institute College of Art. She is currently based out of Johannesburg, South Africa while showcasing in both individual and group exhibitions around the world. Sunstrum was appointed assistant professor in the Department of Visual Art & Art History of York University in 2017.

Career 
Driven by a fascination with ancient mythologies and scientific theories, Sunstrum muses on the origins of time, geological concepts, and ideas about the universe. Her works on paper, large-scale installations, and stop-motion films are rooted in autobiography, addressing the development of transnational identities, human connections, and cross-border rituals. Motivated by her experiences in diverse locales, Sunstrum explores how one's sense of identity develops within geographic and cultural contexts. Her drawings – narrative landscapes that appear simultaneously futuristic and ancient – shift between representational and fantastical depictions of volcanic, subterranean, cosmological, and precipitous landscapes.

Having lived in Africa, Southeast Asia, and the United States, Sunstrum developed an alter-ego, Asme, to convey her evolving selfhood. The image of Asme is often super- imposed with overlapping gestures as a means of suggesting compounded time, illustrating her universal, atemporal existence. Sunstrum's landscapes also expand on themes of timelessness; she reconstructs sites both real and imagined to reveal the small scale of individuals within the vast universe, a concept that is reminiscent of 18th-century notions of the sublime.

Exhibitions 
Remembrances, Portobelo, Panama; El Museo Congo (The Congo Museum), Portobelo, Panama; Hidden Place, Hanes Art Center, University of North Carolina at Chapel Hill (2003)
November Reign, Fox3 Gallery, MICA, Baltimore, MD (2005)
Which is Kind of Interesting, Fox3 Gallery, MICA, Baltimore, MD; Pulp, Fox4 Gallery, MICA, Baltimore, MD (2006)
A Spectacle and Nothing Strange, Fox3 Gallery, MICA, Baltimore, MD; 
New InSight, Art Chicago 2007, Chicago, IL; 
Hyphenation, Union Gallery, University of Maryland, College Park, MD
Time-Based Media Invitational, ArtSpace, Raleigh, NC; 
Off Color, Diaspora Vibe Gallery, Miami, FL (2007)
Cinema Remixed and Reloaded: Black Women Artists and the Moving Image since 1970, Spelman College Museum of Fine Art, Atlanta, GA (2007)
Pulse Art Fair, Miami, Fl, with Marcia Wood Gallery; This Just In, Marcia Wood Gallery, Atlanta, GA, (2008)
See You Again, Marcia Wood Gallery, Atlanta, GA, (2009)
Curate Life Collection Competition, Museum of African Design (MOAD), Johannesburg; We See (in) the Dark, Museum of African Design (MOAD), Johannesburg; Mythopoeia, Tiwani Contemporary, London (2015)
Polyhedra, Tiwani Contemporary, London

Bibliography 
13/03/16 at 03:51 Am by Admin, Admin. “Pamela Phatsimo Sunstrum.” AFRICANAH.ORG. Tiwani Contemporary, 12 Mar. 2016. Web. 19 Apr. 2017.
 ”Pamela Phatsimo Sunstrum.” 30 Artworks, Bio & Shows on Artsy. Artsy, n.d. Web. 19 Apr. 2017.
 ”PAMElA PHATSIMO SUNSTRUM.” Marcia Wood Gallery. Marcia Wood Gallery, 2016. Web. 19 Apr. 2017.
 Haden, Alexis, and Ezra Claymore. “Artist Pamela Phatsimo Sunstrum Explodes on London’s Art Scene.” The South African. The South African, 29 Mar. 2015. Web. 19 Apr. 2017.
 ”Pamela Phatsimo Sunstrum.” Pamela Phatsimo Sunstrum Biography – Pamela Phatsimo Sunstrum on Artnet. N.p., n.d. Web. 19 Apr. 2017.

References

1980 births
Living people
People from Johannesburg
University of North Carolina at Chapel Hill alumni
South African artists
South African contemporary artists
People from Kgatleng District